Vigonovo is a town in the Metropolitan City of Venice, Veneto, Italy. It is south of SR11.

The name Vigonovo derives from the Latin “vicus novus” which means “new village”. 

Before the year 1000 BC the territory was inhabited by Etruscans, Euganeans, Paleovenetians. 

It is believed that around 1000 BC after the destruction of Troy by the Greeks, the members of a tribe of Paphlagonia (province of Asia Minor), called Heneti (hence the name Veneti), landed on the Adriatic coasts and settled there after having expelled the locals Paleovenetian Etruscans. 

In ancient times the town was called Sarmazza because it was the site of a settlement of Sarmatians (ancient people coming from Eeastwards) and just in the medieval period the town was renamed into Vicus Novus.

In 186 BC, at the time of the Roman Empire, the Via Emilia-Altinate was built by the Roman Consul Aemilius Lepidus,  which started from Padua, reached Tombelle, passed through the current Sarmazza, continued through San Pietro di Stra up to Altinum and Aquileia. 

Vigonovo is located in the most extreme point of the area of the Venetian villas that have made the Riviera del Brenta known. 

The municipality is located on the border with the province of Padua. 

With its hamlets of Galta, Tombelle and Celeseo, Vigonovo is extending for about 13 square km west of the Brenta river on flat land. 

Extremely rich in waterways, in addition to the Brenta, the territory is crossed by the Piovego canal and minor others.

Sources

(Google Maps)

Cities and towns in Veneto